Candelaria is a town and municipality located in the Department of Valle del Cauca, Colombia.

Candelaria in Colombia, is part of the metropolitan area of the city of Cali, along with the municipalities adjacent to it. Candelaria is 28 km from Cali.

It has small villages such as El Tiple.

References 

Municipalities of Valle del Cauca Department